The Rural Municipality of McKillop No. 220 is a rural municipality (RM) in the Canadian province of Saskatchewan within Census Division No. 6 and  Division No. 2.

History 
The RM of Strassburg No. 220 was originally incorporated as a rural municipality on December 13, 1909. Its name was changed to the RM of McKillop No. 220 on July 15, 1919.

Geography 
The RM is adjacent to Last Mountain Lake.

Communities and localities 
The following urban municipalities are surrounded by the RM.

Towns
Strasbourg

Villages
Bulyea

Resort villages
Glen Harbour
Island View
Pelican Pointe
Saskatchewan Beach
Sunset Cove

The following unincorporated communities are within the RM.

Organized hamlets
Alta Vista
Colesdale Park
Collingwood Lakeshore Estates
MacPheat Park
Mohr's Beach
North Colesdale Park
Sorensen Beach
Spring Bay
Uhl's Bay

Demographics 

Government 
The RM of McKillop No. 220 is governed by an elected municipal council and an appointed administrator that meets on the second Monday of every month. The reeve of the RM is Bob Schmidt while its administrator is Brandi Morissette. The RM's office is located in Bulyea.

Transportation 
Rail
Bulyea Branch C.P.R.—serves Saskatchewan Beach, Silton, Gibbs, Bulyea,
Brandon-Virden-Saskatoon Section C.P.R.—serves Markinch, Southey, Earl Grey, Bulyea, Strasbourg, Duval, Cymric, Govan.

Roads
Highway 20—serves Bulyea, Saskatchewan
Highway 322—serves Silton, Saskatchewan

See also 
List of rural municipalities in Saskatchewan

References 

Rural municipalities in Saskatchewan
McKillop No. 220
Rural Muni